The hydrogen hypothesis is a model proposed by William F. Martin and Miklós Müller in 1998 that describes a possible way in which the mitochondrion arose as an endosymbiont within a prokaryotic host in the archaea, giving rise to a symbiotic association of two cells from which the first eukaryotic cell could have arisen (symbiogenesis).

According to the hydrogen hypothesis:
 The hosts that acquired the mitochondria were hydrogen-dependent archaea, possibly similar in physiology to modern methanogenic archaea, which use hydrogen and carbon dioxide to produce methane;
 The future mitochondrion was a facultatively anaerobic eubacterium which produced hydrogen and carbon dioxide as byproducts of anaerobic respiration;
 A symbiotic relationship between the two started, based on the host's hydrogen dependence (anaerobic syntrophy).

Mechanism

The hypothesis differs from many alternative views within the endosymbiotic theory framework, which suggest that the first eukaryotic cells evolved a nucleus but lacked mitochondria, the latter arising as a eukaryote engulfed a primitive bacterium that eventually became the mitochondrion. The hypothesis attaches evolutionary significance to hydrogenosomes and provides a rationale for their common ancestry with mitochondria. Hydrogenosomes are anaerobic mitochondria that produce ATP by, as a rule, converting pyruvate into hydrogen, carbon dioxide and acetate. Examples from modern biology are known where methanogens cluster around hydrogenosomes within eukaryotic cells. Most theories within the endosymbiotic theory framework do not address the common ancestry of mitochondria and hydrogenosomes. The hypothesis provides a straightforward explanation for the observation that eukaryotes are genetic chimeras with genes of archaeal and eubacterial ancestry. Furthermore, it would imply that archaea and eukarya split after the modern groups of archaea appeared. Most theories within the endosymbiotic theory framework predict that some eukaryotes never possessed mitochondria. The hydrogen hypothesis predicts that no primitively mitochondrion-lacking eukaryotes ever existed. In the 15 years following the publication of the hydrogen hypothesis, this specific prediction has been tested many times and found to be in agreement with observation.

In 2015, the discovery and placement of the Lokiarchaeota (an archaeal lineage possessing an expanded genetic repertoire including genes involved in membrane remodeling and actin cytoskeletal structure) as the sister group to eukaryotes called into question particular tenets of the hydrogen hypothesis, as Lokiarchaeota appear to lack methanogenesis.

See also
Archezoa

References

Hydrogen biology
Biological hypotheses